Niti Taylor (born 8 November 1994) is an Indian actress known for her portrayal of Nandini Murthy in MTV India's Kaisi Yeh Yaariaan, Shivani Mathur in Ghulaam and Mannat Kaur Khurana in Ishqbaaz.

Early life
Taylor was born in Delhi on 8 November 1994 to a Gujarati father and a Bengali Christian mother from Kolkata.

Career
At the age of 15, Taylor made her television debut with Pyaar Ka Bandhan in 2009. Her breakthrough came through her role of Nandini Murthy in MTV India's Kaisi Yeh Yaariyan, opposite Parth Samthaan.

In 2016 she appeared in the music video "Parindey Ka Pagalpan" opposite Siddharth Gupta.

In 2017, she portrayed the character of Shivani in crime thriller Ghulaam opposite Param Singh.

In 2019, Taylor portrayed the character of Mannat Kaur Khurana in Ishqbaaz . Same year she appeared in a Punjabi-language music video "Cappuccino".

In 2022, she participated in Jhalak Dikhhla Jaa 10 and was paired with choreographer Akash Thapa. They were eliminated in the semi-final weekend.

Since February 2023, Taylor is portraying Prachi Kapoor opposite Randeep Rai in Sony TV's Bade Achhe Lagte Hain 2.

Personal life
Taylor got engaged to her boyfriend Parikshit Bawa on 13 August 2019. They married on 13 August 2020.

Media
In December 2015, Taylor was declared as the highest placed newcomer in the 50 Sexiest Asian Women list of the UK based newspaper Eastern Eye.

Filmography

Films

Television

Web series

Music videos

References

External links

1994 births
Living people
People from Delhi
Indian television actresses
Indian web series actresses
Indian film actresses
Actresses in Hindi television
Actresses in Telugu cinema
Indian Christians
21st-century Indian actresses